Lin Yue (born July 24, 1991, in Chaozhou, Guangdong) is a Chinese diver and a double Olympic gold medal winner. He competed for Team China in Diving at the 2008 Summer Olympics in Beijing and won gold with Huo Liang in the Men's synchronized 10 metre platform.  He also won gold in the same event at the 2016 Summer Olympics in Rio with Chen Aisen.

Background
Lin Yue started diving when he was little, training in a sporting school in his hometown, with a coach named Li Huansen. In the following five years, he went to Guangdong Provincial Weilun Sporting School, under instructor Cao Ke. In the year 2004, he was selected in the Beijing Diving team. His current coach is Zhong Shaozhen().

Major achievements
He claimed the bronze medal in the 2007 World Aquatics Championships.
He claimed the gold medal at the 2008 World Cup - 10m platform synchro.
He won gold medals in the Men's synchronized 10m platform at the 2008 Summer Olympics in Beijing, the 2009 FINA World Championships in Rome, and the 2016 Summer Olympics in Rio. He became the first diver to win a second Olympic gold medal in this event.

He also competed at the 2012 Summer Olympics in the men's 10 metre platform event.

References

1991 births
Living people
People from Chaozhou
Sportspeople from Guangdong
Olympic divers of China
Chinese male divers
Olympic medalists in diving
2016 Olympic gold medalists for China
Divers at the 2016 Summer Olympics
Divers at the 2012 Summer Olympics
Medalists at the 2008 Summer Olympics
Divers at the 2008 Summer Olympics
Asian Games gold medalists for China
Asian Games medalists in diving
Divers at the 2006 Asian Games
Divers at the 2014 Asian Games
Medalists at the 2006 Asian Games
Medalists at the 2014 Asian Games
World Aquatics Championships medalists in diving
Universiade medalists in diving
Universiade gold medalists for China
Medalists at the 2011 Summer Universiade